Union syndicale des journalistes polonais en France ('Polish Journalists' Union in France') was an organization of Polish journalists in France. The organization was founded in 1923. The organization had its headquarters on Rue Bachaumont, in the 2nd arrondissement of Paris. As of 1934, the chairman of the organization was Alfred Bzowiecki.

References

Diaspora organizations in France
1923 establishments in France
Organizations established in 1923
Journalists' trade unions
Polish diaspora in Europe
French journalism organizations